Nitin Agrawal is an Indian politician, serving as Minister of State (Independent charge) for Excise & Liquor Prohibition in the State Government of Uttar Pradesh. He is elected as a member of the 18th Legislative Assembly. He represents the Hardoi constituency of Uttar Pradesh and is an elected member of the Bharatiya Janata Party (BJP). He was elected as the Deputy Speaker of the Uttar Pradesh Legislative Assembly on 18 October 2021. He resigned from his post on 19th January 2022.

Early life and education
Nitin Agrawal was born in Hardoi district. He attended the Symbiosis International Education Centre and University of Delhi and attained B.Com & MBA degrees. His father is Naresh Chandra Agarwal who was MLA from Hardoi constituency for seven terms and also a member of the Rajya Sabha from May 2012 to March 2018.

Political career
Nitin Agrawal has been MLA for three terms. He represented the Hardoi constituency and is a member of the Bhartiya Janta Party (BJP). He was elected in the by-election for the Hardoi constituency for his first term after the sitting MLA resigned to assume membership in the Rajya Sabha.

Posts held

See also

 Hardoi (Assembly constituency)
 18th Uttar Pradesh Assembly
 Uttar Pradesh Legislative Assembly

References 

1981 births
Living people
People from Hardoi
Samajwadi Party politicians
Uttar Pradesh MLAs 2007–2012
Uttar Pradesh MLAs 2012–2017
Uttar Pradesh MLAs 2017–2022
Uttar Pradesh politicians
Bharatiya Janata Party politicians from Uttar Pradesh
Uttar Pradesh MLAs 2022–2027